Statistics of Mestaruussarja in the 1986 season.

Overview 
It was contested by 12 teams, and Kuusysi Lahti won the championship.

League standings

Results

See also
Ykkönen (Tier 2)

References 
 Finland - List of final tables (RSSSF)

Mestaruussarja seasons
Fin
Fin
1